This is a list of the 24 observers to the European Parliament for Hungary in the 1999 to 2004 session. They were appointed by the Hungarian Parliament as observers from 1 May 2003 until the accession of Hungary to the EU on 1 May 2004.

List

Party representation

Hungary
 
2003
Hungary